Konstantinos Tzolakis (born 8 November 2002) is a Greek professional footballer who plays as a goalkeeper for Super League club Olympiacos.

Career
Tzolakis made his senior debut in 2019, at the Cup semi-final against PAOK in which he played the whole game but he conceded 3 goals as Olympiacos lost 3–2. Tzolakis made his league debut in a game against Aris getting subbed on in the place of Bobby Allain in the 78th minute. His next game was a very crucial game for the club, since the main Goalkeeper of Olympiacos, Jose Sa was injured, Tzolakis had to take his place in the starting eleven that faced AEK Athens in the Cup final. Tzolakis made some crucial saves and kept a clean sheet as Olympiacos defeated AEK 1–0 and won the title. 

On 7 October 2020, the talented goalie signed a new contract with Olympiacos until the summer of 2024 for an undisclosed fee.

The followin season season, Tzolakis was mainly the 3rd choice keeper of Olympiacos, but he still managed to play a total of 6 games; 5 league appearances and 1 Cup appearance against Aris. He kept a clean sheet against Asteras Tripolis twice.

On 21 July 2021, Tzolakis made a crucial save and kept a clean sheet in his european debut against Neftchi Baku in a 1–0 home win on the 2nd qualification round of UEFA Champions League.

Honours

Olympiacos
Super League Greece: 2019–20, 2020–21, 2021–22
Greek Cup: 2019–20

References

2002 births
Living people
Greek footballers
Greece under-21 international footballers
Greece youth international footballers
Super League Greece players
Super League Greece 2 players
Olympiacos F.C. players
Olympiacos F.C. B players
Association football goalkeepers
Footballers from Chania